Aaron Chia Teng Fong  (Chinese: 谢定峰, born 24 February 1997) is a Malaysian badminton player. He joined the national team since 2015. He represented Malaysia in the 2018 Thomas Cup. Chia and his partner Soh Wooi Yik were the All England Open finalists and the Southeast Asian Games gold medalist in 2019. They are the current reigning world champion in men's doubles discipline. The duo won the bronze medal in the men's doubles at the 2020 Summer Olympics, and won the men's doubles title at the 2022 World Championships.

Early life and background
Chia was born in Batu Berendam, Melaka to Malaysian Chinese parents, Chan Mee Kee and Chia Boon Foo. He is the second of three siblings. His interest in badminton began at the age of four when he often followed his father to the badminton court. Chia represented Melaka when he was just 11 years old. At the age of 14, he managed to enter Bukit Jalil Sports School (SSBJ) and started training with the Badminton Association of Malaysia (BAM) when he was in Form 5.

Career

2021: Olympic bronze 
In late July, Chia partnered up with Soh Wooi Yik at the men's doubles event at the Summer Olympics. The duo won the bronze medal by defeating Mohammad Ahsan and Hendra Setiawan 17–21, 21–17, 21–14 in the bronze medal playoff, winning bronze for Malaysia.

2022: First world title for Malaysia 
In late August, Chia partnered Soh Wooi Yik as the 6th seeds at the 2022 World Championships. In the final, they defeated 3-time world champions Mohammad Ahsan and Hendra Setiawan 21–19, 21–14 to clinch Malaysia's first-ever gold medal in the tournament.

Achievements

Olympic Games 
Men's doubles

BWF World Championships 
Men's doubles

Asian Championships 
Men's doubles

Commonwealth Games 
Men's doubles

Southeast Asian Games 
Men's doubles

BWF World Tour (4 runners-up) 
The BWF World Tour, which was announced on 19 March 2017 and implemented in 2018, is a series of elite badminton tournaments sanctioned by the Badminton World Federation (BWF). The BWF World Tour is divided into levels of World Tour Finals, Super 1000, Super 750, Super 500, Super 300, and the BWF Tour Super 100.

Men's doubles

BWF International Challenge/Series (4 runners-up) 
Men's doubles

  BWF International Challenge tournament
  BWF International Series tournament
  BWF Future Series tournament

Personal life
Chia is married to Goh Mui Kee and the couple has two daughters.

Record against selected opponents 
Record against year-end Finals finalists, World Championships semi finalists, and Olympic quarter finalists. Accurate as of 7 September 2022.

Soh Wooi Yik 
Aaron Chia and Soh Wooi Yik have six winning streaks in the head-to-head record against Satwiksairaj Rankireddy and Chirag Shetty. Meanwhile, Chia and Soh have a poor head-to-head record against Mohammad Ahsan and Hendra Setiawan (4–7), Marcus Fernaldi Gideon and Kevin Sanjaya Sukamuljo (2–6), and also Takuro Hoki and Yugo Kobayashi (2–5).

Awards

Honours 
  :
 Officer of the Order of the Territorial Crown (K.M.W) (2022)
 :
 Distinguished Service Star (B.C.M.) (2021)

References

External links 
 

1997 births
Living people
People from Malacca
Malaysian sportspeople of Chinese descent
Malaysian male badminton players
Badminton players at the 2020 Summer Olympics
Olympic badminton players of Malaysia
Olympic bronze medalists for Malaysia
Olympic medalists in badminton
Medalists at the 2020 Summer Olympics
Badminton players at the 2022 Commonwealth Games
Commonwealth Games gold medallists for Malaysia
Commonwealth Games bronze medallists for Malaysia
Commonwealth Games medallists in badminton
Competitors at the 2019 Southeast Asian Games
Southeast Asian Games gold medalists for Malaysia
Southeast Asian Games silver medalists for Malaysia
Southeast Asian Games medalists in badminton
21st-century Malaysian people
Medallists at the 2022 Commonwealth Games